The Ministry of Economy and Finance (MEH) was a ministerial department in the Government of Spain that merged the traditional ministries of Finance and Economy, with competences on economic affairs, public finance and budgets. It was established on two occasions: the first time during the premierships of Felipe González (1982–1996) and the first term of José María Aznar (1996–2000), and the second time during the premiership of José Luis Rodríguez Zapatero (2004–2011).

Due to its size and the vast amount of competences on economic and finance affairs under its control, it has been often dubbed as a "superministry".

List of officeholders
Office name:
Ministry of Economy and Finance (1982–2000; 2004–2011)

Notes

References

1982 establishments in Spain
2004 establishments in Spain
2000 disestablishments in Spain
2004 disestablishments in Spain
Defunct departments of the Spanish Government